is a Japanese actress, voice actress and singer. Her debut album  was released on July 21, 2010. The album charted at No.100 on the Oricon album charts. She was previously a soloist under NICE GIRL Project! and was a member of Canary Club CAN'S division with Ayumi Takada from 2007 until its hiatus in 2012.

Voice roles
Gokujō!! Mecha Mote Iinchō (Mimi Kitagami)
Hyakko (Hitsugi Nikaidō)
Sasami: Magical Girls Club (Sasami Iwakura)
Let's Make a Mug Too (Mami Koizumi)

Stage roles
Lucky Star ≈ On Stage (Tsukasa Hiiragi)
New Lobo the King of Currumpaw (Blanca)

Discography

Singles
as herself
 2008: 
as Mimi Kitagami (CV Mana Ogawa) with MM Gakuen Gasshōbu
 2009: 
 2010: 
 2010: 
 2010: 
 2010:

Albums
as herself
 2010: 1 Teenage Blues
as Mimi Kitagami (CV Mana Ogawa) with MM Gakuen Gasshōbu
 2010:

EPs
as herself
 2020: Moment

References

External links
  
 Mana Ogawa Canaria Club profile 
 Mana Ogawa's Radio Teenage Blues (Japan FM Network affiliated)

1993 births
Living people
Japanese female models
Japanese women pop singers
Japanese idols
Japanese women singers
Japanese video game actresses
Japanese voice actresses
Models from Saitama Prefecture
Musicians from Saitama Prefecture
Nice Girl Project!
Voice actresses from Saitama Prefecture